Hell for Certain Branch is a stream in Pocahontas County, West Virginia, in the United States.

The stream was so named on account of the treacherous terrain in the area. Hell for Certain Branch has been noted for its unusual place name.

See also
List of rivers of West Virginia

References

Rivers of Pocahontas County, West Virginia
Rivers of West Virginia